Nanteuil-le-Haudouin is a commune in the Oise department in northern France.

In Popular Culture
The town was shown in a map of France in the movie Inglourious Basterds and credited as the fictional town of "Nadine".

See also
 Communes of the Oise department
 Inglourious Basterds

References

External links

 Official site

Communes of Oise